Serratolamna is an extinct genus of mackerel sharks that is placed in the monotypic family Serratolamnidae.

Species
Species within this genus include:
Serratolamna africana
Serratolamna amonensis
Serratolamna caraibaea
Serratolamna gafsana White, 1926
Serratolamna khderii
Serratolamna lerichei (Casier, 1946) 
Serratolamna serrata (Agassiz, 1843)

Description
The fossils of Serratolamna mainly consist of teeth and scattered vertebrae. The teeth are asymmetrical with smooth crowns and multiple cusplets. The basal margin of the roots are V-shaped. Based on the size of its teeth, it appears Serratolamna grew no larger than 1.5 metres.

Distribution
Fossils of species within this genus have been found in Late Cretaceous of France, Madagascar, Mexico, Morocco, Sweden and United States.

See also
 Prehistoric fish

References

Cretoxyrhinidae
Late Cretaceous sharks
Eocene sharks
Paleocene sharks
Fossils of France
Fossils of Sweden
Mooreville Chalk
Fossil taxa described in 1991